The 1968 British Grand Prix was a Formula One motor race held at the Brands Hatch Circuit on 20 July 1968. It was race 7 of 12 in both the 1968 World Championship of Drivers and the 1968 International Cup for Formula One Manufacturers. The 80-lap race was won by Jo Siffert, his first Formula One victory, and the first victory by a Swiss driver. Siffert's win also marked the 9th and final win for the privateer Rob Walker Racing Team.

Classification

Qualifying

Race

Championship standings after the race 

Drivers' Championship standings

Constructors' Championship standings

Note: Only the top five positions are included for both sets of standings.

References

Further reading

British Grand Prix
British Grand Prix
Grand Prix
British Grand Prix